Sub-Radio is an American pop band based in Washington, D.C. Guitarist Matt Prodanovich started the band in 2009 while still in high school in Sterling, Virginia, but the band did not formally release music until 2016. The group independently released their debut album, Same Train // Different Station, in March 2016. They have opened for Smallpools and Vinyl Theatre, and made an appearance at the 2017 Firefly Music Festival.

Following the release of two followup EPs — Headfirst (2018) and Dog Years (2019) — the band played more than 30 dates on a U.S. tour in summer 2019. Their latest EP Thoughts Lights Colors Sounds, featuring lead single "Disco," was released in August 2020. Their song "Fair Fight" features vocals from Max Bemis of Say Anything (band).

Unable to tour during the pandemic, guitarist Matt Prodanovich had noticed the numbers of people watching live streams on Reddit and there was a potential to reach new fans. Sub-Radio turned to streaming on Reddit. Starting in October 2020 Sub-Radio starting streaming on Reddit's open access platform called Reddit Public Access Network (RPAN). The streams quickly caught on and Sub-Radio streams have been seen by over 7 million unique viewers.  These viewers translated beyond Reddit to a 250% increase in the number of monthly listeners on music platforms Spotify and Apple Music. 

Sub-Radio's sound has been described as "infectious, bright pop," and “tailor-made for festival sing-alongs.” Their music has been compared to that of The Killers, The Aces and Panic At the Disco.

Discography 
 Same Train // Different Station (2016)
 Headfirst EP (2018)
 Dog Years EP (2019)
 Clark Kent EP (2020)
 Thoughts Lights Colors Sounds EP (2020)
  Past Selves EP (2023)

Band members

Current members 
 Adam Bradley – lead vocals (2016–present)
 Kyle Cochran – guitar, keyboards, backing vocals (2019–present), bass (2022-present)
 John Fengya – keyboards, guitar, backing vocals (2016–present)
 Michael Pereira – drums (2016–present)
 Matt Prodanovich – guitar, backing vocals (2016–present)

Former members 
 Mike Chinen – guitar, keyboards, backing vocals (2016–2018)
 Barry Siford – bass (2016–2022)

Timeline

References 

Musical groups from Virginia